Malšovice is a municipality and village in Děčín District in the Ústí nad Labem Region of the Czech Republic. It has about 1,000 inhabitants.

Administrative parts
Villages of Borek, Choratice, Hliněná, Javory, Nová Bohyně and Stará Bohyně are administrative parts of Malšovice.

History
The first written mention of Malšovice is from 1515.

References

Villages in Děčín District